Lightnin' Loops was a pair of Shuttle Loop roller coasters that were originally installed at Six Flags Great Adventure in Jackson, New Jersey. The ride consisted of two identical tracks, both of which were later relocated and renamed: the still-extant Diamond Back at Frontier City in Oklahoma City and the defunct Python at Six Flags America in Largo, Maryland (near Washington, D.C.).
 
Manufactured by Arrow Development, the ride opened on May 23, 1978, with a unique feature at the time. Both tracks interlocked at their vertical loop element. The ride's popularity declined in the mid-to-late 1980s, and a fatal incident occurred in 1987. The ride had limited operation when it reopened later that year and was eventually dismantled in 1992.

History

Six Flags Great Adventure 
Lightnin' Loops was built in 1977 and opened in 1978 at Six Flags Great Adventure. Six Flags had acquired the park in 1977 and Lightnin' Loops was planned by the prior ownership as far back as 1976.The coaster was located on the west side of the park that is currently occupied by Movietown, Batman: The Ride, and Nitro.

Lightnin' Loops was the world's only interlocking dual shuttle shuttle loop coaster. Lightnin' Loops featured a launch system that propelled the train downward into the loop and to another launch station at the same height as the loading station. Then the train was launched backwards returning to the loading station.

This coaster continued to be the star attraction at the park throughout the 1980s, although other coasters such as Rolling Thunder (built in 1979), Sarajevo Bobsleds (built in 1984) and Ultra Twister (built in 1986) also were major coasters. The popularity of Lightnin' Loops faded in 1989 when the bobsleds were replaced with a multiple looping full circuit then-state of the art roller coaster called the Great American Scream Machine (also built by Arrow), which featured seven inversions, three of which were loops.

Closure and relocation 
By 1990, the area that Lightnin' Loops was occupying became a dull area of the park due to the lack of theming. Nearby, however Adventure Rivers would be added in 1991. A new stunt show arena was built next to Lightnin' Loops, and the area was transformed in "Action Town". In May 1992, management announced that Lightnin' Loops would close at the end of July, and it was dismantled in August. One of the loops would be sold to Funtime Parks, the other loop would move to the site formerly occupied by Ultra Twister and construction of "Batman The Ride" would begin on the site of the space occupied by Lightnin' Loops. Batman: The Ride lead to the conversion of the area into Movietown.

At the end of 1992, however, it was decided that both tracks of Lightnin' Loops would be sold to Funtime Parks. Lightnin' Loops was then sent to two different parks then owned by Funtime. The upper track was sent to Adventure World in Largo, Maryland (near Washington, D.C.). It was rebuilt and reopened in 1994 as Python. The lower track was sent to Frontier City near Oklahoma City. It was rebuilt and reopened in 1994 as Diamond Back and is the only Lightnin' Loop track still in operation.

Adventure World was renamed Six Flags America in 1999, and the Python was disassembled to make room for more modern roller coasters and attractions. It was scrapped in 2005 after nearly 5 years in storage.

Accidents
On June 17, 1987, a 19-year-old woman from Chester, Pennsylvania fell  to her death as a result of not being properly secured by the over-the-shoulder harness. She was pronounced dead at a nearby hospital with Basilar skull fracture suffered from the fall. Early reports indicated that the woman tried to board late after the safety harness was locked and the attendant couldn't stop the train. An investigation found the ride itself to be operating properly, but that an error was made by the ride operator, who started the ride without ensuring all passengers were secured. The park was fined the state maximum of $1,000, and the ride reopened on October 10, 1987.

Also in June 1987, a man from New York sued Six Flags Great Adventure, claiming that he had been injured after going on the ride in 1985.

References

External links
Lightnin' Loops article with pictures at GreatAdventureHistory.com
Roller Coaster DataBase Profile

Six Flags Great Adventure
Roller coasters operated by Six Flags
Python
Python
Former roller coasters in New Jersey
Amusement rides that closed in 1987